The 1965 North Indian Ocean cyclone season had no bounds, but cyclones tend to form between April and December, with peaks in May and November. The season has no official bounds but cyclones tend to form between April and December. These dates conventionally delimit the period of each year when most tropical cyclones form in the northern Indian Ocean. There are two main seas in the North Indian Ocean—the Bay of Bengal to the east of the Indian subcontinent and the Arabian Sea to the west of India. The official Regional Specialized Meteorological Centre in this basin is the India Meteorological Department (IMD), while the Joint Typhoon Warning Center releases unofficial advisories. An average of four to six storms form in the North Indian Ocean every season with peaks in May and November. Cyclones occurring between the meridians 45°E and 100°E are included in the season by the IMD.

Systems

Cyclone One (01B)
Two cyclones that hit on May 11 and June 1 killed a total of 47,000 people.

Cyclone Two (02B)
Two cyclones that hit on May 11 and June 1 killed a total of 47,000 people.

Tropical Storm Seven (07B)

Tropical Storm Eleven (11B)

Tropical Storm Twelve (12A)

In December 1965, a cyclone hit Karachi, killing an estimated 10,000 people, making it Pakistan's deadliest tropical cyclone since 1950.

Cyclone Thirteen (13B)
A cyclone hit East Pakistan on December 15, causing about 10,000 casualties.

Cyclone Fourteen (14B)

See also

 North Indian Ocean tropical cyclone
 List of tropical cyclone records
 1965 Atlantic hurricane season
 1965 Pacific hurricane season
 1965 Pacific typhoon season
 Australian cyclone seasons: 1964–65, 1965–66
 South Pacific cyclone seasons: 1964–65, 1965–66
 South-West Indian Ocean cyclone seasons: 1964–65, 1965–66

References

External links
India Meteorological Department
Joint Typhoon Warning Center 

 
Tropical cyclones in India
1965 in India